= Dario de Vita =

German footballer

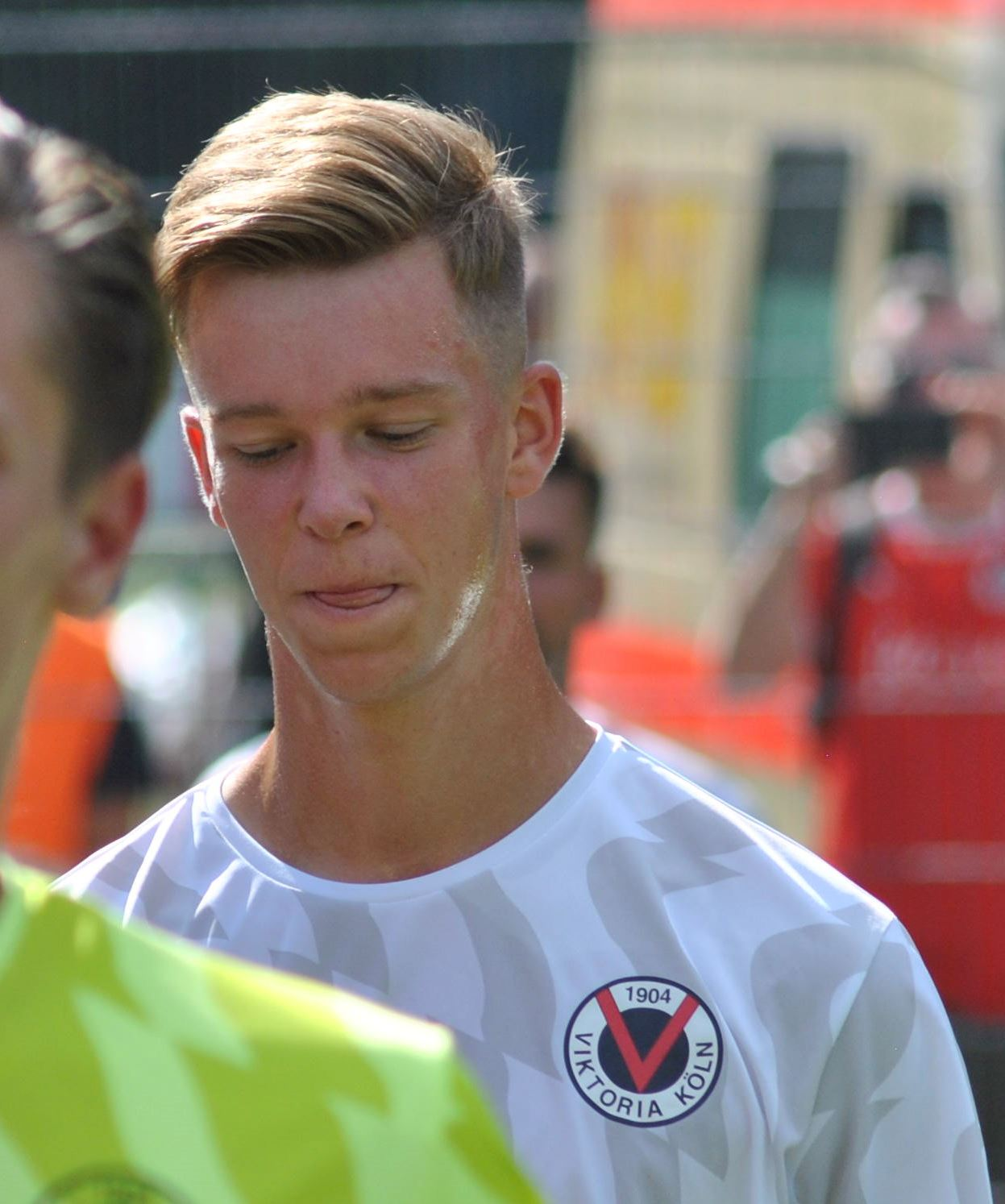
- de Vita in 2019

Personal information
- Date of birth: 12 February 2000 (age 26)
- Place of birth: Cologne, Germany
- Height: 1.83 m (6 ft 0 in)
- Position: Centre back

Team information
- Current team: Alemannia Aachen
- Number: 27

Youth career
- –2016: 1. FC Köln
- 2016–2019: Viktoria Köln

Senior career*
Years	Team	Apps	(Gls)
2019–2022	Viktoria Köln	9	(0)
2022–	Alemannia Aachen	1	(0)
- * Club domestic league appearances and goals as of 11 November 2022

Dario de Vita (born 12 February 2000) is a German professional footballer who plays as a centre-back for Alemannia Aachen.
